The Rim of the Pacific Exercise (RIMPAC), is the world's largest international maritime warfare exercise. RIMPAC is held biennially during June and July of even-numbered years from Honolulu, Hawaii, with the exception of 2020 where it was held in August. It is hosted and administered by the United States Navy's Indo-Pacific Command, headquartered at Pearl Harbor, in conjunction with the Marine Corps, the Coast Guard, and Hawaii National Guard forces under the control of the Governor of Hawaii.

Participants
The first RIMPAC, held in 1971, involved forces from Australia, Canada, New Zealand, the United Kingdom (UK), and the United States (US). Australia, Canada, and the US have participated in every RIMPAC since then. Other regular participants are Chile, Colombia, France, Indonesia, Japan, Malaysia, the Netherlands, Peru, Singapore, South Korea, and Thailand. The Royal New Zealand Navy was frequently involved until the 1985 ANZUS nuclear ships dispute and was subsequently absent, until returning to take part in more recent RIMPACs since 2012.

Several observer nations are usually invited, including Ecuador, India, Mexico, and the Philippines, who became an active participant for the first time in 2012. While not contributing any ships, observer nations are involved in RIMPAC at the strategic level and use the opportunity to prepare for possible full participation in the future.

The United States contingent has included an aircraft carrier strike group, submarines, up to a hundred aircraft and 20,000 Sailors, Marines, Coast Guardsmen and their respective officers. The size of the exercises varies from year to year.

In the National Defense Authorization Act for Fiscal Year 2022, both houses of the US have called for a Taiwanese participation of RIMPAC 2022 in the face of "increasingly coercive and aggressive behavior" by China.

By year

RIMPAC 1992 
RIMPAC 1992 took place between 19 June and 2 August 1992. Among the vessels taking part was the aircraft carrier , which was assigned to Battle Force X-Ray which also included ten Japan Maritime Self-Defense Force (JMSDF) vessels (including the submarine ).

During the exercise, a minor incident occurred when on 13 July 1992, a Qantas Boeing 747-400 flying from Los Angeles to Sydney inadvertently entered into the exercise's area near Hawaii. The aircraft's crew soon overheard a radio warning from the cruiser  that 'hostile action' would be taken against any United States Air Force (USAF) aircraft (playing the role of the pretend aggressor) attempting to enter the Cowpens defensive area. The message was accidentally broadcast on the International Air Distress Frequency instead of the internal military radio network, leading to the 747 obeying the warning and leaving the area (despite the airliner not being in any danger). This led to the US apologizing to the Australian Government. A Qantas spokesperson stated that the flight was only delayed by 19 minutes.

 RIMPAC 1994 
RIMPAC 1994 involved 57 vessels, and more than 200 aircraft from the United States, Japan, South Korea, Australia, and Canada each taking part in the exercise. These included  and her carrier battle group,  battlegroup, the  amphibious ready group and the Kitty Hawks battlegroup. The exercise's boundaries that year reached as far west as Midway Island. During the exercise, the Independences air wing (CVW-5) conducted war-at-sea strikes against the Kitty Hawk, with the support of Japanese and US vessels.

 RIMPAC 1996 

RIMPAC 1996 involved more than 48 ships and 200 aircraft. Among these vessels were the US carriers Independence, Kitty Hawk and their respective carrier battle groups. Like in RIMPAC '94, the Independence conducted air operations against the Kitty Hawk battle group.

This exercise was notable for the accidental shooting down of an US Navy aircraft by a JMSDF vessel.

At the time of the incident (4:15PM) in clear skies, the Intruder was at  towing a target for Yūgiri to shoot down. The radar aboard the destroyer instead locked on to the radar signature of the Intruder and thus fired on it. The engines caught fire with the hydraulics seizing up before the crew safely ejected. Initially thought to be a mechanical it was later determined to be human error.

RIMPAC 1996 was also the first time that the Chilean Navy would be involved in the exercise.

 RIMPAC 2010 

On 23 June 2010, U.S. Pacific Fleet commander Admiral Patrick M. Walsh and Combined Task Force commander Vice Admiral Richard W. Hunt announced the official start of the month-long 2010 Rim of the Pacific (RIMPAC) exercise during a press conference held in Lockwood Hall at Joint Base Pearl Harbor–Hickam. RIMPAC 2010 was the 22nd exercise in the series that originated in 1971. The exercise was designed to increase the operational and tactical proficiency of participating units in a wide array of maritime operations by enhancing military-to-military relations and interoperability. 32 ships, 5 submarines, over 170 aircraft, and 20,000 personnel participated in RIMPAC 2010, the world's largest multi-national maritime exercise.

RIMPAC 2010 brought together units and personnel from Australia, Canada, Chile, Colombia, France, Indonesia, Japan, Malaysia, Netherlands, Peru, South Korea, Singapore, Thailand, and the United States. During the exercise, participating countries conducted gunnery, missile, anti-submarine, and air defense exercises, as well as maritime interdiction and vessel boarding, explosive ordnance disposal, diving and salvage operations, mine clearance operations, and an amphibious landing. RIMPAC 2010 will also emphasize littoral operations with ships like the U.S. littoral combat ship , the French frigate , and the Singaporean  RSS Supreme.

On 28 June 2010, the aircraft carrier  arrived in Pearl Harbor to participate in RIMPAC 2010. Ronald Reagan was the only aircraft carrier to participate in this exercise. During the in-port phase of RIMPAC, officers and crew of the 14 participating navies interact in receptions, meetings, and athletic events. Ronald Reagan completed its Tailored Ships Training Availability (TSTA) exercises prior to RIMPAC 2010.

During 6–7 July 2010, 32 naval vessels and five submarines from seven nations departed Pearl Harbor to participate in Phase II of RIMPAC 2010. This phase included live fire gunnery and missile exercises; maritime interdiction and vessel boardings; and anti-surface warfare, undersea warfare, naval maneuvers and air defense exercises. Participants also collaborated in explosive ordnance disposal; diving and salvage operations; mine clearance operations; and amphibious operations. Phase III involved scenario-driven exercises designed to further strengthen maritime skills and capabilities.

During RIMPAC 2010, over 40 naval personnel from Singapore, Japan, Australia, Chile, Peru, and Colombia managed combat exercises while serving aboard Ronald Reagan (pictured). This involved managing anti-submarine warfare and surface warfare for Carrier Strike Group Seven and the entire RIMPAC force, including the use of radar, charts, and high-tech devices to monitor, chart, and communicate with other ships and submarines. Tactical action officers from the different countries coordinated the overall operational picture and provided direction and administration to the enlisted personnel involved in the Sea Combat Control (SCC) activities. Also, Ronald Reagan conducted a live Rolling Airframe Missile (RAM) launch, firing at a simulated target, the first since 2007.

On 30 July 2010, RIMPAC 2010 concluded with a press conference held at Merry Point Landing on Joint Base Pearl Harbor–Hickam. A reception for over 1,500 participants, distinguished visitors and special guests was held in the hangar bays of the carrier Ronald Reagan.

During RIMPAC 2010, participating countries conducted three sinking exercises (SINKEX) involving 140 discrete live-fire events that included 30 surface-to-air engagements, 40 air-to-air missile engagements, 12 surface-to-surface engagements, 76 laser-guided bombs, and more than 1,000 rounds of naval gunfire from 20 surface combatant warships. Units flew more than 3100 air sorties, completed numerous maritime interdiction and vessel boardings, explosive ordnance disposal, diving and salvage operations and mine clearance operations and 10 major experiments, with the major one being the U.S. Marine Corps Enhanced Company Operations experiment. Ground forces from five countries completed five amphibious landings, including nine helicopter-borne amphibious landings and 560 troops from ship-to-shore mission. In all, 960 different training events were scheduled and 96 percent were completed in all areas of the Hawaiian operations area, encompassing Kāneʻohe Bay, Bellows Air Force Station, the Pacific Missile Range Facility, and the Pohakuloa Training Area.

 RIMPAC 2012 

RIMPAC 2012 is the 23rd exercise in the series and started on 29 June 2012. 42 ships, including the aircraft carrier  and other elements of Carrier Strike Group 11, six submarines, 200 aircraft and 25,000 personnel from 22 nations took part in Hawaii. The exercise involved surface combatants from the U.S., Canada, Japan, Australia, South Korea and Chile. The US Navy demonstrated its 'Great Green Fleet' of biofuel-driven vessels for which it purchased 450,000 gallons of biofuel, the largest single purchase of biofuel in history at a cost of $12m. On 17 July,  delivered 900,000 gallons of biofuel and traditional petroleum-based fuel to Nimitzs Carrier Strike Group 11.

The exercises included units or personnel from Australia, Canada, Chile, Colombia, France, India, Indonesia, Japan, Malaysia, Mexico, Netherlands, New Zealand, Norway, Peru, the Republic of Korea, the Republic of the Philippines, Russia, Singapore, Thailand, Tonga, the United Kingdom and the United States. Russia participated actively for the first time, as did the Philippines, reportedly due to the escalating tensions with the People's Republic of China over ownership of Scarborough Shoal.

RIMPAC 2012 marked the debut of the U.S. Navy's new P-8A Poseidon land-based anti-submarine patrol aircraft, with two P-8As participating in 24 RIMPAC exercise scenarios as part of Air Test and Evaluation Squadron One (VX-1) based at Marine Corps Base Hawaii in Kaneohe Bay.

The 2012 movie Battleship is about two Arleigh-Burke-class destroyers (USS John Paul Jones and USS Sampson) and one Japanese Kongō-class destroyer (JS Myoko) discovering an alien armada during RIMPAC 2012.

 RIMPAC 2014 

RIMPAC 2014 was the 24th exercise in the series and took place from 26 June to 1 August, with an opening reception on 26 June and a closing reception on 1 August.

For the first time, the Royal Norwegian Navy actively participated in the exercise. Norway sent one  and possibly Norwegian marine special forces. China was also invited to send ships from their People's Liberation Army Navy; marking not only the first time China participated in a RIMPAC exercise, but also the first time China participated in a large-scale United States-led naval drill. On 9 June 2014, China confirmed it would be sending four ships to the exercise, a destroyer, frigate, supply ship, and hospital ship.

The year's RIMPAC participants were Australia, Brunei, Canada, Chile, China, Colombia, France, India, Indonesia, Japan, Malaysia, Mexico, Netherlands, New Zealand, Norway, Peru, the Philippines, Singapore, South Korea, Tonga, the United Kingdom, and the United States. Thailand was uninvited from the exercise following a 22 May military coup. Thailand's absence means that 22 nations participated in RIMPAC instead of the 23 that had been advertised. The exercise involved 55 vessels, more than 200 aircraft, and some 25,000 personnel.

 RIMPAC 2016 

India participated in RIMPAC 2016.

In April 2016, the People's Republic of China was also invited to RIMPAC 2016 despite the tension in South China Sea.

 RIMPAC 2018 
In January 2018, China announced that it had been invited. On 23 May 2018, however, the Pentagon announced that it had "disinvited" China because of recent militarization of islands in the South China Sea. The PRC has previously attended RIMPAC Exercises on 2014 and 2016.

On 30 May 2018, the US Navy announced that about 25,000 naval personnel and 52 ships and submarines from 26 countries will participate. These are the following units that would take part in the exercise:

In this edition of RIMPAC, the Chilean Navy was responsible for leading the naval exercise, being the first non-English-speaking Navy to carry out this task. The election of Chile as leader of the Task Groups is a recognition of the high performance achieved in recent editions and the quality of its personnel, which since its first participation in 1996 has been demonstrating its preparation and professionalism. This appointment also places this country in a leadership position in the Latin American and world level in the planning and execution of combined naval operations.

Israel, Vietnam and Sri Lanka made their debut in RIMPAC. Brazil was due to make its debut too, but cancelled its participation for the second time. The exercise also included a live firing of the AGM-158C LRASM (Long Range Anti-Ship Missile) for the first time.

 RIMPAC 2020 
On 29 April 2020, the US Navy announced RIMPAC would be held from 17 to 30 August. It would be at-sea-only event because of the ongoing COVID-19 pandemic. Twenty-five (25) nations have been invited to participate. Israel was among the original 25 invited nations, but declined to attend due to the pandemic. There has been some opposition to New Zealand's participation and there have been calls from peace activists for New Zealand not to attend. The Philippines sent its first missile-capable frigate on its maiden voyage, which was only commissioned into service last 10 July 2020, as its "shakedown cruise" where its performance would be tested by the crew in the two-week exercises.

On 17 August 2020, the US Navy announced that participation has scaled down to 10 nations, 22 ships, one submarine, and approximately 5,300 personnel, all at sea. These are the following navies that would take part in the exercise:

On 29 August 2020, forces began firing on former , a Charleston-class amphibious cargo vessel that was decommissioned in 1994. The US Navy and partner nations wrapped up the biennial RIMPAC 2020 exercise over the weekend with the sinking of the decommissioned amphibious cargo vessel.

 RIMPAC 2022 

RIMPAC 2022 was held in the summer of that year, between 29 June and 4 August. It was expected to be a more traditional RIMPAC with the loosening of COVID-19 restrictions.

On 23 February 2022, it was announced that 27 countries are expected to take part. On 14 April 2022, it was announced that Canada would send four warships to participate. However, the two Kingston-class MCDVs scheduled to participate, HMCS Brandon and HMCS Edmonton, were unavailable to participate. The same day, Peru announced that the corvette BAP Guise would also take part.

On 1 June 2022, a total of 26 countries have confirmed to take part at Exercise RIMPAC 2022, with the list as follows: Australia, Brunei, Canada, Chile, Colombia, Denmark, Ecuador, France, Germany, India, Indonesia, Israel, Japan, South Korea, Malaysia, Mexico, the Netherlands, New Zealand, Peru, the Philippines, Singapore, Sri Lanka, Thailand, Tonga, the United Kingdom, and the United States (being 11 countries in Asia, 5 countries in Europe, 4 countries in South America, 3 countries in North America and 3 countries in Oceania).

Experiments
RIMPAC experiments have included a range of sectors important to international militaries. In RIMPAC 2000, for example, the first of the Strong Angel international humanitarian response demonstrations were held on the Big Island of Hawai'i near Pu'u Pa'a. That series continued with events in the summer of 2004 and again in 2006.

Participants have also conducted exercises in ship-sinking and torpedo usage. They also have tested new naval vessels and technology. For example, in 2004, the United States Navy tested the Australian-built , a  experimental wave-piercing catamaran that draws only  of water, has a top speed of almost , and can transport 605 tons of cargo.

Gallery

In popular culture
 RIMPAC 2012 was the main setting of the 2012 film Battleship.
 The IMAX documentary film Aircraft Carrier: Guardians of the Sea covers RIMPAC 2014.NCIS: Hawaiʻi S2 E1 Prisoners Dilemma''''' story involves RIMPAC 2022.

References

External links

 United States Pacific Command
 Commander, U.S. Third Fleet
 RIMPAC site

Russia–United States military relations
China–United States military relations
Military exercises involving the United States
Military exercises involving Russia
Military exercises involving China
Military in Hawaii
United States Navy
Japanese military exercises